Anna Vasilievna of Moscow (1393 – August 1417) was a Byzantine empress consort by marriage to John VIII Palaiologos. She died while her husband was still the junior co-emperor of the Byzantine Empire.

Family

She was a daughter of Vasily I of Moscow and Sophia of Lithuania. Her maternal grandparents were Vytautas the Great and his first wife, Anna and Dmitry Donskoy and his wife Eudoxia of Moscow.

Marriage

She married John VIII in 1414. Her husband was the eldest surviving son of Manuel II Palaiologos and Helena Dragaš. John was named Despotes in 1416 and seems to have assumed the position of co-emperor shortly thereafter.

Anna was second in status only to her mother-in-law among the women of the Byzantine court. The history of Doukas records her dying of the "plague" in 1417. She is thought to be a victim of bubonic plague. Following the Black Death this plague continued to strike parts of Europe sporadically until the 17th century, each time with reduced intensity and fatality, suggesting an increased resistance due to genetic selection.

Ancestry

External links

1393 births
1417 deaths
Yurievichi family
Palaiologos dynasty
15th-century deaths from plague (disease)
15th-century Byzantine empresses
14th-century Russian princesses
15th-century Russian princesses
Burials at Lips Monastery
14th-century Russian women
15th-century Russian people
14th-century Russian people